Events from the year 1622 in art.

Events
April – Diego Velázquez moves from Seville to Madrid.

Paintings

 Artemisia Gentileschi – Portrait of a Condottiero
 Guercino – Et in Arcadia ego
 Frans Hals – Marriage Portrait of Isaac Massa and Beatrix van der Laen
 Gerard van Honthorst – Adoration of the Shepherds
 Pieter Lastman – The Angel and the Prophet Balaam
 Johann Liss – Judith in the Tent of Holofernes
 Guido Reni - St. Francis in Ecstasy
 Dirck van Baburen (some dates approximate)
 Backgammon Players
 Christ among the Doctors
 The Lute Player
 The Procuress
 Young Man Singing
 Esaias van de Velde – The Castle Ferry
 Anthony van Dyck – Teresia, Lady Shirley (approximate date)
 Diego Velázquez
 La mulata (approximate date)
 Portrait of Don Luis de Góngora

Births
February 18 - Thomas Regnaudin, French sculptor (died 1706)
February 27 – Carel Fabritius, Dutch painter who works in Rembrandt's studio in Amsterdam (died 1654)
May 4 – Juan de Valdés Leal, Spanish Baroque painter (died 1690)
date unknown
Luo Mu, Chinese painter, poet and prose writer (died 1706)
Giovanni Maria Morandi, Italian painter of altarpieces (died 1717)
Theodore Poulakis, Greek Renaissance painter (died 1692)
probable
Dominique Barrière, French painter and engraver (died 1678)
Abraham Lambertsz van den Tempel, Dutch Golden Age painter (died 1672)

Deaths
April 15 - Leandro Bassano, Venetian artist and younger brother of Francesco Bassano the Younger (born 1557)
May 17 - Leonello Spada, Italian Caravaggisto specializing in decorative quadratura painting (born 1576)
June 3 - Francesco Carracci, Italian painter and engraver (born 1595)
June 22 - Bernardino Cesari, Italian painter of the late-Mannerist and early Baroque period (born 1565)
August 10 - Giovanni Battista Viola, Italian painter of landscape canvases (born 1576)
December 12 - Bartolomeo Manfredi, Italian painter, a leading member of the Caravaggisti (born 1582)
date unknown
Costantini de' Servi, Italian painter (born 1554)
Aurelio Lomi, Italian painter of frescoes (born 1556)
Vespasiano Strada, Italian painter and engraver (born 1582)
Gillis van Valckenborch, Flemish painter (born 1570
probable - Yi Chong, Korean painter (born 1541)

 
Years of the 17th century in art
1620s in art